The episode list for the television series Doogie Howser, M.D., including descriptions, given in broadcast order on its original network ABC. There are a total of 97 episodes produced and broadcast among its four seasons from September 20, 1989, to March 24, 1993.

Series overview

Episodes

Season 1 (1989–1990)

Season 2 (1990–91)

Season 3 (1991–92)

Season 4 (1992–93)

References

External links

Lists of American comedy-drama television series episodes
Lists of American sitcom episodes
Lists of medical television series episodes